The Detroit Air Defense Sector (DEADS) is an inactive United States Air Force organization.  Its last assignment was with the Air Defense Command (ADC) 26th Air Division at Custer Air Force Station (AFS), Michigan.  It was inactivated on 1 April 1966.

History
DEADS was originally designated as the 4627th Air Defense Wing, but was redesignated before being organized in January 1957 at Custer AFS, Michigan.  It became operational in September 1958, but did not assume control of former ADC Central Air Defense Force units with a mission to provide air defense of lower Michigan, northeast Indiana, and most of Ohio until 1959.  The organization provided command and control over several aircraft, missile and radar squadrons.

On 1 September 1959 the new Semi Automatic Ground Environment (SAGE) Direction Center (DC-06)  and Combat Center (CC-01) became operational.    DC-06  was equipped with dual AN/FSQ-7 Computers.   The day-to-day operations of the command were to train and maintain tactical units flying jet interceptor aircraft (F-86 Sabre, F-89 Scorpion, F-101 Voodoo, F-102 Delta Dagger, F-104 Starfighter, F-106 Delta Dart) and operating interceptor missiles (CIM-10 Bomarc) and radar squadrons in a state of readiness with training missions and series of exercises with Strategic Air Command and other units simulating interceptions of incoming enemy aircraft.

The Sector was inactivated 1 April 1966 as part of ADC reorganization and consolidation and replaced at Custer AFS by the 34th Air Division.   Most of its units were reassigned to 34th or the 29th Air Division.

Lineage
 Designated as 4627th Air Defense Wing, SAGE
 Redesignated as Detroit Air Defense Sector on 8 January 1957 and organized
 Discontinued and inactivated on 1 April 1966.

Assignments
 30th Air Division, 8 January 1957
 26th Air Division, 4 September 1963 – 1 April 1966

Stations
 Custer AFS, Michigan, 8 January 1957 – 1 April 1966

Components

Wing
 1st Fighter Wing (Air Defense)
 Selfridge AFB, Michigan, 1 April 1959 - 1 April 1966

Group
 79th Fighter Group (Air Defense)
 Youngstown Airport, Ohio, 1 April 1959 - 1 March 1960

Interceptor Squadrons

 56th Fighter-Interceptor Squadron
 Wright-Patterson AFB, Ohio, 1 April 1959 - 1 March 1960
 87th Fighter-Interceptor Squadron
 Lockbourne AFB, Ohio, 1 April 1959 - 1 April 1966

 319th Fighter-Interceptor Squadron
 Bunker Hill AFB, Indiana, 1 April 1959 - 1 March 1960
 445th Fighter-Interceptor Squadron
 Wurtsmith AFB, Michigan, 15 July 1963 - 1 April 1966

Missile Squadron
 35th Air Defense Missile Squadron (BOMARC)
 Niagara Falls Air Force Missile Site, New York, 4 September 1963 - 1 April 1966

Radar Squadrons

 661st Aircraft Control & Warning Squadron (later 661st Radar Squadron (SAGE))
 Selfridge AFB, Michigan, 1 April 1959 - 1 April 1966 
 662nd Aircraft Control & Warning Squadron (later 662d Radar Squadron (SAGE))
 Oakdale Army Installation, Pennsylvania, 1 November 1959 - 15 June 1960; 4 September 1963 - 1 April 1966 
 664th Aircraft Control & Warning Squadron (later 664th Radar Squadron (SAGE))
 Bellefontaine AFS, Ohio, 1 April 1959 - 1 April 1966 
 752d Radar Squadron (SAGE)
 Empire AFS, Michigan, 15 July 1963 - 1 April 1966 
 754th Aircraft Control & Warning Squadron (later 754th Radar Squadron (SAGE))
 Port Austin AFS, Michigan, 1 April 1959 - 1 April 1966 

 763d Radar Squadron (SAGE)
 Lockport AFS, New York,  4 September 1963 - 1 April 1966 
 781st Aircraft Control & Warning Squadron (later 781st Radar Squadron (SAGE))
 Custer AFS, Michigan,  1 April 1959 - 25 June 1965
 783rd Aircraft Control & Warning Squadron (later 783d Radar Squadron (SAGE))
 Guthrie AFS, West Virginia,  1 July 1961 - 1 April 1966
 784th Aircraft Control & Warning Squadron (later 784th Radar Squadron (SAGE))
 Snow Mountain AFS, Kentucky,  1 August 1961 - 25 May 1962

Weapons Systems
 F-86D, 1959-1960
 F-86L, 1959-1960
 F-89J, 1959-1960
 F-101B, 1960-1966
 F-102A, 1959-1960
 F-104A, 1959-1960
 F-106A, 1960-1966
 CIM-10 Bomarc, 1963-1966

See also
 List of USAF Aerospace Defense Command General Surveillance Radar Stations
 Aerospace Defense Command Fighter Squadrons
 List of United States Air Force aircraft control and warning squadrons

Notes

References

 
 
 
 Radomes.org Detroit  Air Defense Sector

1957 establishments in Michigan
Air defense sectors of the United States Air Force
Military units and formations established in 1957
Military units and formations in Michigan
1966 disestablishments in Michigan